Tananas (pronounced tuh-naa-nuhs) is a South African band formed in 1987. Originally it consisted of Mozambican Gito Baloi (bass and vocals), Ian Herman (drums and percussion) and Steve Newman (acoustic guitar). First recorded by the independent label Shifty Records, Tananas combined jazz, Mozambican salsa and township jive (or mbaqanga). They released eight albums, the last two on the Sony label.

Tananas built a loyal following in their home country since the late 1980s, and performed at WOMAD festivals around the world. They worked individually or as a band with Paul Simon and Sting, and have shared a stage with the likes of Bonnie Raitt, Suzanne Vega and Youssou N'dour.

The band broke up in 1993 but reunited for some performances until Gito was shot dead in Johannesburg on April 4, 2004 while on his way home from a concert in Pretoria. He was 39 years old.

Musical style 
Tananas used to be essentially an instrumental band allied to jazz but unmistakably African at heart. In the group's latter stage the recordings have included more vocals by Mozambican singer and bass player Gito Baloi, who sang in Shangaan, Tsonga and Portuguese.  At first glance, their music cannot be identified as typical "South African," as they play around with a wide variety of styles and merge them into their own unique blend.  Tananas released their first self-titled album in 1988 on Shifty and for the South African music scene, this was a revolution. The album mixed different styles such as jazz, Mozambican salsa, and township jive, which had not been manifest before and took the country by storm.

Members 
Steve Newman, guitar
Gito Baloi, bass and vocals
Ian Herman, drums and percussion

Discography 

Tananas – 1988
Spiral – 1990
Orchestra Mundo – 1994
Time – 1994
Unamunacua – 1996
The Collection – 1997
Seed – 1999
Alive in Jo'burg – 2001

References

South African jazz ensembles